The Flevo Festival was an open air Christian music festival held each August in the Netherlands.  The festival was first organized as the Kamperland Festival in 1978 by the Dutch arm of Youth for Christ and became a private foundation in 2002.  The last event was held in 2012; one month later, the organization decided to stop gatherings because the quantity of visitors was decreasing:  For example, in 2012 the number of people attending the festival was 6,000, whereas in 2011 that number was 9,500 people.

In its heyday, the festival attracted approximately 10,000 to 20,000 people each year.  It highlighted all musical styles, but especially rock, and was considered by some to be the most important European Christian festival.  Previous headline bands have included Stryper, dc Talk, Jars of Clay, Sixpence None the Richer, Bride, Audio Adrenaline, SONICFLOOd, Switchfoot and Five Iron Frenzy.

In 2013 a group of former volunteers from Flevo Festival organised a festival in line with the 35 years of history of Flevo, naming it Flavor Festival.

Main Stage Performances (period from 1991)

External links
 Official website
 Historical site about Kamperland 1978 (first Flevo festival)

Christian music festivals
Music festivals in the Netherlands
Recurring events established in 1978
1978 establishments in the Netherlands